These are the full results of the 2015 NACAC Championships which took place in San José, Costa Rica, from 7 to 9 August at the Estadio Nacional.

Men's results

100 meters

Final – 8 August
Wind: -0.1 m/s

Semifinals
2 semifinals - Advance 3 on place + 2 on time

Semifinal 1 – 7 August
Wind: +2.7 m/s

Semifinal 2 – 7 August
Wind: +3.0 m/s

Heats
4 heats - Advance 3 on place + 4 on time

Heat 1 – 7 August
Wind: +4.4 m/s

Heat 2 – 7 August
Wind: +1.9 m/s

Heat 3 – 7 August
Wind: +1.7 m/s

Heat 4 – 7 August
Wind: +2.2 m/s

200 meters

Final – 9 August
Wind: +1.8 m/s

Semifinals
3 semifinals - Advance 2 on place + 2 on time

Semifinal 1 – 7 August

Semifinal 2 – 7 August
Wind: +0.8 m/s

Semifinal 3 – 7 August
Wind: +0.8 m/s

Heats
5 heats - Advance 4 on place + 4 on time

Heat 1 – 7 August
Wind: +1.5 m/s

Heat 2 – 7 August
Wind: -0.2 m/s

Heat 3 – 7 August
Wind: +0.8 m/s

Heat 4 – 7 August
Wind: +3.5 m/s

Heat 5 – 7 August
Wind: +2.0 m/s

400 meters
Final – 8 August

Semifinals
3 semifinals - Advance 2 on place + 2 on time

Semifinal 1 – 7 August

Semifinal 2 – 7 August

Semifinal 3 – 7 August

800 meters

Final – 9 August

Semifinals
3 semifinals - Advance 2 on place + 2 on time

Semifinal 1 – 7 August

Semifinal 2 – 7 August

Semifinal 3 – 7 August

1500 meters
Final – 8 August

5000 meters
Final – 8 August

110 meters hurdles

Final – 8 August
Wind: +1.5 m/s

Semifinals
2 semifinals - Advance 3 on place + 2 on time

Semifinal 1 – 7 August
Wind: +1.2 m/s

Semifinal 2 – 7 August
Wind: +1.6 m/s

400 meters hurdles

Final – 9 August

Semifinals
2 semifinals - Advance 3 on place + 2 on time

Semifinal 1 – 7 August

Semifinal 2 – 7 August

3000 meters steeplechase
Final – 9 August

4x100 meters relay
Final – 9 August

4x400 meters relay
Final – 9 August

High jump
Final – 7 August

Pole vault
Final – 8 August

Long jump
Final – 8 August

Triple jump
Final – 7 August

Shot put
Final – 9 August

Discus throw
Final – 7 August

Hammer throw
Final – 9 August

Javelin throw
Final – 9 August

Women's results

100 meters

Final – 8 August
Wind: -0.1 m/s

Semifinals
3 semifinals - Advance 2 on place + 2 on time

Semifinal 1 – 7 August
Wind: +1.2 m/s

Semifinal 2 – 7 August
Wind: +2.3 m/s

Semifinal 3 – 7 August
Wind: +1.4 m/s

200 meters

Final – 9 August
Wind: +1.3 m/s

Semifinals
3 semifinals - Advance 2 on place + 2 on time

Semifinal 1 – 7 August
Wind: -0.5 m/s

Semifinal 2 – 7 August
Wind: +0.5 m/s

Semifinal 3 – 7 August
Wind: -0.4 m/s

400 meters

Final – 8 August

Semifinals
3 semifinals - Advance 2 on place + 2 on time

Semifinal 1 – 7 August

Semifinal 2 – 7 August

Semifinal 3 – 7 August

800 meters

Final – 9 August

Semifinals
2 semifinals - Advance 3 on place + 2 on time

Semifinal 1 – 7 August

Semifinal 2 – 7 August

1500 meters
Final – 8 August

5000 meters
Final – 9 August

100 meters hurdles

Final – 8 August
Wind: +4.1 m/s

Semifinals
3 semifinals - Advance 2 on place + 2 on time

Semifinal 1 – 7 August
Wind: -0.3 m/s

Semifinal 2 – 7 August
Wind: +2.5 m/s

Semifinal 3 – 7 August
Wind: +2.1 m/s

400 meters hurdles

Final – 9 August

Semifinals
2 semifinals - Advance 3 on place + 2 on time

Semifinal 1 – 7 August

Semifinal 2 – 7 August

3000 meters steeplechase
Final – 9 August

4x100 meters relay
Final – 9 August

4x400 meters relay
Final – 9 August

High jump
Final – 9 August

Pole vault
Final – 7 August

Long jump
Final – 9 August

Triple jump
Final – 7 August

Shot put
Final – 8 August

Discus throw
Final – 7 August

Hammer throw
Final – 8 August

Javelin throw
Final – 7 August

References

Events at the NACAC Championships in Athletics
NACAC Championships in Athletics - Results
2015 in Costa Rican sport
International athletics competitions hosted by Costa Rica